Prunus eburnea is a species of wild almond native to Iran, Pakistan and Afghanistan . It is a dense shrub 0.2 to 1.2m tall with gray bark. It is morphologically similar to Prunus lycioides, P. spinosissima, P. erioclada and P. brahuica. It can be distinguished from the similar species by having a pubescent hypanthium. A genetic and morphological analysis shows that it is a good species, with its closest relative being Prunus erioclada. The cross of Prunus scoparia and Prunus eburnea produces Prunus × iranshahrii.

Notes

References

eburnea
Endemic flora of Iran
Plants described in 1880